Phalaenopsis bastianii is a species of orchid endemic to the Philippines. Similar in form to a miniature Phalaenopsis lueddemanniana, the colour of the flower is similar to that of Phalaenopsis mariae.

External links
 
 

bastianii